Santa Silvia is a 20th-century parochial church and titular church in southwest Rome, dedicated to Saint Silvia (6th century AD, mother of Gregory the Great).

History 

The church was built in 1963–1968.

On 21 February 2001, it was made a titular church to be held by a cardinal-priest.

Cardinal-protectors
 Jānis Pujats (2001–present)

References

Titular churches
Santa Silvia
Roman Catholic churches completed in 1968
20th-century Roman Catholic church buildings in Italy